Coryell is an album by jazz guitarist Larry Coryell that was released in 1969 by Vanguard Records. The album was produced by Daniel Weiss and engineered by David Baker, Paul Berkowitz and Randy Rand.

Reception

Mark Allan of AllMusic calls the album a "strong outing" from "this sensational guitarist", singling out the track "The Jam with Albert". He says Coryell's "masterful playing is especially impressive compared to his ill-advised singing".

Track listing

Personnel
 Larry Coryell – guitar, bass, keyboards, vocals
 Mike Mandel – keyboards
 Chuck Rainey – guitar, bass guitar
 Mervin Bronson – bass guitar
 Albert Stinson – bass guitar

Guests
 Jim Pepper – flute, saxophone
 Ron Carter – bass
 Bernard Purdie – drums

Production
 David Baker – engineering
 Paul Berkowitz – engineering
 Daniel Weiss – producer
 Julie Coryell – liner notes
 Ed Friedner – mixing
 Randy Rand – engineering
 Mike Sullivan – cover design, photo design
 Jules E. Halfant – cover design

References

1969 albums
Larry Coryell albums
Vanguard Records albums